There are two rivers named Tapirapé in Brazil:

 Tapirapé River (Mato Grosso)
 Tapirapé River (Pará)